Go-Round was the third album released by Jeff Coffin, released in 2001.  This album was the first album recorded and released with the Mu'tet, a constantly changing group of guest musicians that play with Coffin.

Track listing
"Intro/Tuesday's Waterloo" – 7:41
"Walking on Thin Water" – 5:04	
"Go-Round" – 6:04
"Zuleikha" – 4:50
"Tall and Lanky" – 6:53
"As in the Beginning..." – 2:26
"Playin' the Worm" – 4:59
"Only Love" – 5:51
"Multa et Mira" – 5:17
"Dewey" – 12:26	
"Ibrahim" – 6:12

Personnel
Jeff Coffin – saxophone, flute, clarinet, bass clarinet 
Noa Ben-Amotz – spoken vocals
Chris Walters – accordion, piano
Derek Jones – acoustic bass
Tom Giampietro – drums, percussion

2001 albums
Jeff Coffin albums